George Collier Remey (August 10, 1841 – February 10, 1928) was a rear admiral of the United States Navy, serving in the Civil War and the Spanish–American War.

Early life
George Collier Remey was born at Burlington, Iowa on August 10, 1841, to Eliza Smith (née Howland) and William Butler Remey. His father was captain of a steamboat in Burlington. He graduated from the United States Naval Academy in 1859.

Career
Initially assigned to the sloop  on the Asiatic Station, he returned to the United States with the outbreak of the Civil War and served in the gunboat  during the Peninsular Campaign, March–July 1862; and, afterward, in the blockade of Charleston. In April 1863, he assumed duties as Executive Officer in the screw sloop  and during attacks on Fort Wagner briefly commanded Marblehead. From August 23 to September 7, he commanded a battery of naval guns on Morris Island, and on the night of September 7–8, led the second division of a boat attack on Fort Sumter. The division made shore, but was smashed by gunfire. Remey and the surviving members of his party were forced to surrender. Following 13 months of imprisonment at Columbia, S.C., Remey was exchanged and returned to duty, serving in the sidewheel steamship  until the end of the war.

In 1866, he saw service off the west coast of South America.  In 1870–71, he participated in the Tehuantepec Survey Expedition. After commanding the screw sloop  and service in the Mediterranean, he was appointed captain in 1885. Four years later he assumed command of the protected cruiser , flagship of the Pacific Squadron.

Commandant of the Portsmouth Navy Yard at the outbreak of the Spanish–American War, he was ordered to take charge of the Naval Base Key West, whence he directed the supply and repair of all naval forces in Cuban waters and organized supply lines to Army forces in Cuba. After peace returned, Rear Admiral Remey resumed duties at the Portsmouth Navy Yard. In April 1900, he assumed command of the Asiatic Station and for the next two years guided the ships of that station through the diplomatic and military chaos that was China.

Remey then returned to the United States and served for a year as Chairman of the Lighthouse Board before retiring on August 10, 1903.

Personal life
Remey married Mary Josephine Mason, daughter of Iowa Chief Justice Charles Mason, on July 8, 1873. Their son was Mason Remey. He had two brothers, William Butler Remey, who served as Judge Advocate General of the Navy and Edward Wallace Remey, who also served in the navy.

Rear Admiral Remey died at Washington, D.C., on February 10, 1928.

Namesake
In 1943, the destroyer  was named in his honor.

Gallery

References

External links
 

1841 births
1928 deaths
Union Navy officers
American military personnel of the Spanish–American War
United States Navy admirals
People of Iowa in the American Civil War
Burials at Arlington National Cemetery
People from Dupont Circle